Irving Rolando Ávalos González (born March 14, 1991, in Tepic, Nayarit, Mexico) is a Mexican footballer who last played for Celaya FC. His nickname is Pirri.

Club career
Avalos came  out of the Guadalajara youth system.

References

External links
 
 

1991 births
Living people
Mexican footballers
Association football midfielders
C.D. Guadalajara footballers
Coras de Nayarit F.C. footballers
Loros UdeC footballers
FC Juárez footballers
Club Celaya footballers
Liga MX players
Ascenso MX players
Liga Premier de México players
Tercera División de México players
Footballers from Nayarit
Sportspeople from Tepic, Nayarit